3, 2, 1 ¡A ganar! (English:3, 2, 1 ¡To win!) was an Argentine television program, hosted by Alejandro "Marley" Wiebe from 1 February until November 26, 2010 on Telefe. The day of its debut scored a rating of 13.9 points.

Mechanical program
The program consists of several games where participants must prove their physical prowess and strategy skills. Telephone games, where people participate for various prizes, like cheese rations and bottles of wine, are also available. The main prize of the program was a trip to the 2010 FIFA World Cup. Once the World Cup started, the biggest prize was a trip to Orlando, Florida, United States.

Between 23 August and 30 August 2010, it was transmitted from the resort town of Las Leñas in Mendoza, with snow games due to the winter season.

3, 2 , 1 ¡A ganar! ended on November 26, 2010, with 211 episodes.

Cast

Host: Alejandro "Marley" Wiebe
Locution: Osvaldo Príncipi and Carla Bonfante
Assistant games: Leandro Alimonti and Noelia Marzol
Comedians: Nazareno Móttola and Marcos "Bicho" Gómez
Address: Fernando Emiliozzi
Recurring characters: Mauricio Trech, Fernando Colombo and Julián Cavero

References

External links
Official website

Argentine game shows
América TV original programming
2010 Argentine television series debuts
2010s game shows